B. Ketchum House is a historic home located in Fort Salonga in the  Town of Huntington in Suffolk County, New York. It is a -story, six-bay shingled dwelling. The main entrance features a four-pane transom, simple molded surround, and gable-roof canopy. It was built about 1765 on what is today the northwest corner of Middleville Road and Bread-and-Cheese Hollow Road, and representative of the early settlement of Huntington.

It was added to the National Register of Historic Places in 1985.

References

Houses on the National Register of Historic Places in New York (state)
Houses completed in 1765
Houses in Suffolk County, New York
National Register of Historic Places in Suffolk County, New York